Higher education is tertiary education leading to the award of an academic degree. Higher education, also called post-secondary education, third-level or tertiary education, is an optional final stage of formal learning that occurs after completion of secondary education. It represents levels 5, 6, 7, and 8 of the 2011 version of the International Standard Classification of Education structure. Tertiary education at a non-degree level is sometimes referred to as further education or continuing education as distinct from higher education.

The right of access to higher education
The right of access to higher education is mentioned in a number of international human rights instruments. The UN International Covenant on Economic, Social and Cultural Rights of 1966 declares, in Article 13, that "higher education shall be made equally accessible to all, on the basis of capacity, by every appropriate means, and in particular by the progressive introduction of free education". In Europe, Article 2 of the First Protocol to the European Convention on Human Rights, adopted in 1950, obliges all signatory parties to guarantee the right to education.

Definition
Higher education, also called post-secondary education, third-level or tertiary education, is an optional final stage of formal learning that occurs after completion of secondary education. This consists of Universities, Colleges and Polytechnics that offer formal degrees beyond high school or secondary school education.

The International Standard Classification of Education in 1997 initially classified all tertiary education together in 1997 version of its schema. They were referred to as level 5 and doctoral studies at level 6. In 2011, this was refined and expanded 2011 version of the structure. Higher education at undergraduate level, masters and doctoral level became levels 6, 7, and 8. Non-degree level Tertiary education, sometimes referred to as further education or continuing education was reordered ISCED 2011 level 4, with level 5 for some higher courses.

In the days when few pupils progressed beyond primary education or basic education, the term "higher education" was often used to refer to secondary education, which can create some confusion. This is the origin of the term high school for various schools for children between the ages of 14 and 18 (United States) or 11 and 18 (UK and Australia).

Providers

In the US, higher education is provided by universities, academies, colleges, seminaries, conservatories, and institutes of technology, and certain college-level institutions, including vocational schools, universities of applied sciences, trade schools, and other career-based colleges that award degrees. Tertiary education at non-degree level is sometimes referred to as further education or continuing education as distinct from higher education.

Higher education includes teaching, research, exacting applied work (e.g. in medical schools and dental schools), and social services activities of universities.

Within the realm of teaching, it includes both the undergraduate level, and beyond that, graduate-level (or postgraduate level). The latter level of education is often referred to as graduate school, especially in North America. In addition to the skills that are specific to any particular degree, potential employers in any profession are looking for evidence of critical thinking and analytical reasoning skills, teamworking skills, information literacy, ethical judgment, decision-making skills, fluency in speaking and writing, problem solving skills, and a wide knowledge of liberal arts and sciences.

History 

The oldest known institutions of higher education are credited to Dynastic Egypt, with Pr-Anx (houses of life) built as libraries and scriptorium, containing works on law, architecture, mathematics, and medicine, and involved in the training of "swnw" and "swnwt" (male and female Doctors); extant Egyptian papyri from the 3rd millennia BC, are in several collections.

In the Greek world, Plato's Academy (c. 387 - 86 BC), Aristotle's Lycaeum (c. 334 - 86 BC) and other philosophical-mathematical schools became models for other establishments, particularly in Alexandria of Egypt, under the Ptolemies. 

In South Asia, the city of Takṣaśilā, later the great Buddhist monastery of Nālandā (c. 427 - 1197 CE), attracted students and professors even from distant regions. 

In China, the Han dynasty established chairs to teach the Five Confucean Classics, in the Grand School, Taixue (c. 3 - 1905 CE), to train cadres for the imperial administration. All these higher-learning institutions became models for other schools within their sphere of cultural influence. 

In 425 CE, the Byzantine emperor Theodosius II innovated as he established the Pandidakterion, with a faculty of 31 professors, to train public servants. In the 7th and 8th centuries, "cathedral schools" were created in Western Europe. Meanwhile, the first Medresahs were founded in the Moslem empire – initially mere primary schools in the premises of major mosques, which gradually evolved toward secondary, later higher education. However high the intellectual level of these schools could be, it would be anachronistic to call them "universities". Their organization and purposes were markedly different from the corporations of students and teachers, independent from both the Church and the State, which established themselves from the 12th century in Western Europe as Universitas Studiorum.

According to UNESCO and Guinness World Records, the University of al-Qarawiyyin in Fez, Morocco is the oldest existing continually operating higher educational institution in the world. and is occasionally referred to as the oldest university by scholars. Undoubtedly, there are older institutions of higher education, for example, the University of Ez-Zitouna in Montfleury, Tunis, was first established in 737. Bologna University, Italy, founded in 1088, is the world's oldest university in continuous operation, and the first university in the sense of a higher-learning and degree-awarding institute, as the word universitas was coined at its foundation.

20th century
Since World War II, developed and many developing countries have increased the participation of the age group who mostly studies higher education from the elite rate, of up to 15 per cent, to the mass rate of 16 to 50 per cent. In many developed countries, participation in higher education has continued to increase towards universal or, what Trow later called, open access, where over half of the relevant age group participate in higher education. Higher education is important to national economies, both as an industry, in its own right, and as a source of trained and educated personnel for the rest of the economy. College educated workers have commanded a measurable wage premium and are much less likely to become unemployed than less educated workers.

21st century
In recent years, universities have been criticized for permitting or actively encouraging grade inflation. Also, the supply of graduates in many fields of study is exceeding the demand for their skills, aggravating graduate unemployment, underemployment, overqualification, credentialism and educational inflation. Some commentators have suggested that the impact of the COVID-19 pandemic on education is rapidly making certain aspects of the traditional higher education system obsolete.

Statistics
A 2014 report by the Organisation for Economic Co-operation and Development states that by 2014, 84 percent of young people were completing upper secondary education over their lifetimes, in high-income countries. Tertiary-educated individuals were earning twice as much as median workers. In contrast to historical trends in education, young women were more likely to complete upper secondary education than young men.  Additionally, access to education was expanding and growth in the number of people receiving university education was rising sharply. By 2014, close to 40 percent of people aged 25–34 (and around 25 percent of those aged 55–64), were being educated at university.

Recognition of studies
The Lisbon Recognition Convention stipulates that degrees and periods of study must be recognised in all of the Signatory Parties of the convention.

See also 

 :Category:Higher education by country
 List of higher education associations and alliances
 College and university rankings
 Governance in higher education
 Graduation
 Higher education accreditation
 Higher education bubble
 Higher education policy
 Higher Education Price Index
 Institute
 UnCollege
 Hochschule
 League of European Research Universities
 Technical and Further Education (TAFE)

Higher education by country
Tertiary education in Australia
Higher education in Canada
Higher education in Ukraine
Universities in the United Kingdom
Higher education in the United States
Higher education in the Philippines
Higher education in Portugal

Notes

References

Further reading

External links

Association for the Study of Higher Education
American Educational Research Association
World Bank Tertiary Education

 
Educational stages
Tertiary education